Siccia caffra is a moth in the family Erebidae. It was described by Francis Walker in 1854. It is found in South Africa.

References

Endemic moths of South Africa
Moths described in 1854
Nudariina